Bob Degen Jr (born January 24, 1944 in Scranton, Pennsylvania, United States) is an American jazz pianist. Much of his work has been in the trio format.

Life and Career 
Degen was born in Scranton, Pennsylvania in 1944. Both of his parents were performers; his father played country and western guitar and his mother was a tap-dancer. He attended Berklee College of Music from 1961 until 1964 and played locally in Boston while there. He was influenced by jazz musician and multi-instrumentalist Art Kreinberg and played in a trio with Kreinberg and bassist Doug Smith in the early 1960s. In the mid-1960s he played in Europe with Dexter Gordon, Art Farmer, Carmell Jones, and Albert Mangelsdorff, and in 1968 recorded an album as leader. At the end of the decade he played with Paul Motian, as well as with Gary Peacock and Buddy DeFranco in the early 1970s.

In 1974 Degen moved to Germany, where he played often with Heinz Sauer. Since then, he has played with Makaya Ntshoko, the Frankfurter Jazz Ensemble, Adelhard Roidinger, Joki Freund, Leszek Zadlo, Günter Lenz, and Uli Beckerhoff.

Discography

As leader
 Celebrations (Calig, 1968)
 Sequoia Song (Enja, 1976)
 Chartreuse (Enja, 1978)
 Children of the Night (Enja, 1978)
 Hidden Track (Trion, 1981)
 Joy - Friday Night (Dr. Jazz, 1995)
 Catability (Enja, 1998)
 Sandcastle (Free Flow 1998)
 What's Your Dream? (Trion, 2008)
 Jake Remembered (Enja, 2010)

References

Further reading 

American jazz pianists
American male pianists
Jazz musicians from Pennsylvania
1944 births
Living people
American expatriates in Germany
20th-century American pianists
21st-century American pianists
20th-century American male musicians
21st-century American male musicians
American male jazz musicians